Frederick Tomkins (6 October 1886 – 14 September 1974) was a British wrestler. He competed in the men's freestyle bantamweight at the 1908 Summer Olympics.

References

External links
 

1886 births
1974 deaths
British male sport wrestlers
Olympic wrestlers of Great Britain
Wrestlers at the 1908 Summer Olympics